The 2005 Australian Carrera Cup Championship was a CAMS sanctioned national motor racing championship open to Porsche 911 GT3 Cup cars. The championship, which was the third Australian Carrera Cup Championship, was administered by CupCar Australia Pty Ltd. and was promoted as the “Wright Patton Shakespeare Carrera Cup Australia”. The title was won by Fabian Coulthard.

Calendar
The championship was contested over a nine round series with three races per round.

Points system
Points were awarded in each race as per the following table:

Results

All cars were Porsche 911 GT3 Cup Type 996s as mandated by the technical regulations for the championship.

Race 2 at the Bathurst round was stopped after an accident and no points were awarded for the race.

References

Australian Carrera Cup Championship seasons
Carrera Cup Championship